Prakashpur is a small town in Sunsari District in the Koshi Zone in southeastern Nepal.It lies in ward no.10 of Barahakshetra municipality.It is near the Indo-Nepal border.It is famous for its beautiful and peaceful environment. Most of the people come here to visit Koshi river which is one of the longest river in Nepal. It is also famous for its diversity in culture.

At the time of the 1991 Nepal census, Prakashpur had a population of 11,110 people living in 1987 households, primarily employed in agriculture.

Geography

Prakashpur city is near the Indo-Nepal-China Tibet border, south of Mount Everest, Southwest of Dharan, in Sunsari district of Koshi zone, Nepal. The VDC is bounded by Mahendranagr to the north, Bhokraha to the south, Dumraha to the east, and Madhuban to the west. It is bisected by the Koshi River, with the western half of the VDC being part of the Koshi Tappu Wildlife Reserve.

Transportation
The main routes to Prakashpur are:
Inaruwa-Bhokraha-Prakashpur Road (13 km)
Prakashpur-Mahendranagar-Nadaha-Dharan (30 km) Approx.
Prakashpur-Singiya-Jhumka-Pakali-Itahari (via Ramdhuni Temple) (17 km)
Loukahi-Madhuban-Prakashpur-Rajabas-Mahendranagar-Chatara (Barahachhetra-New Saptakoshi Bridge-Barahachhetra Temple)

Health
Prakashpur Health Post is a Government Body charge with providing health services.

Governance 

Prakashpur is controlled by the Nepalese Government.

Notables
Deepak Limbu
nepaliboy

References

Populated places in Sunsari District